Minglou Station is an underground metro station of Line 3 in Ningbo, Zhejiang, China. It is situated at the crossing of Zhongxing Road and Tongtu Road north. It was opened on 30 June 2019.

Exits 
Minglou station has three exits.

References 

Railway stations in Zhejiang
Railway stations in China opened in 2019
Ningbo Rail Transit stations